Iztok Čop (born 17 June 1972) is a Slovenian rower and Olympic gold medalist.

Biography
Čop was born in Kranj, SR Slovenia, and started rowing at the age of 13 in Bled, where Slovenia's best rowing club is located.

Originally rowing in the coxless pairs, Čop finished second in the World Championships in 1991, and won Bronze at the Barcelona Olympics in 1992 with Denis Žvegelj (the first Olympic medal for independent Slovenia). He then switched to the single scull, winning gold at the 1995 World Championship, but came fourth at the Atlanta Olympics in 1996. He then changed to the men's double sculls with Luka Špik, and won the 1999 World Championships, and gold at the Sydney Olympics in 2000, which was the first Olympic gold medal for Slovenia since its independence.

Špik and Čop were the favourites to win the men's double sculls at the 2004 Summer Olympics, but finished in the silver medal position.

Špik and Čop came into the 2012 Summer Olympics not as favorites; however, with a strong performance in the semifinals they became contenders for a medal. After taking an early lead and holding it until nearly the 1500 m mark, they lost the lead to the Italians and the later winners from New Zealand. They finished in third position, giving Slovenia its second medal of the Olympics after Urška Žolnir won the gold 2 days earlier.

In 2008 Čop became the fourth Slovenian to compete at five Olympics, after shooter Rajmond Debevec (eight Olympics) in 2000, biathlete/cross country skier Sašo Grajf in 2002, and biathlete Janez Ožbolt in 2006.

Čop lives in Radovljica with his wife Petra and daughters Ruby and Amber.

Achievements

Olympic Games
 1992: Barcelona (ESP) – 3rd place (coxless pair with Denis Žvegelj)
 1996: Atlanta (USA) – 4th place (single scull)
 2000: Sydney (AUS) – 1st place (double scull with Luka Špik)
 2004: Athens (GRE) – 2nd place (double scull with Luka Špik)
 2008: Beijing (CHI) – 6th place (double scull with Luka Špik)
 2012: London (GBR) – 3rd place (double scull with Luka Špik)

Junior World Championships:
 1989: Szeged (HUN) – 1st place (coxless pair)
 1990: Aiguebelette (FRA) – 1st place (coxless pair)

World Championships:
 1990: Lake Barrington (AUS) – 7th place (coxless four)
 1991: Vienna (AUT) – 2nd place (coxless pair)
 1993: Roudnice (CZE) – 3rd place (coxless pair)
 1994: Indianapolis (USA) – 3rd place (single scull)
 1995: Tampere (FIN) – 1st place (single scull)
 1997: Aiguebelette (FRA) – 4th place (single scull)
 1998: Cologne (GER) – 4th place (single scull)
 1999: St. Catharines (CAN) – 1st place (double scull)
 2001: Lucerne (SUI) – 2nd place (single scull)
 2002: Seville (ESP) – 2nd place (single scull)
 2003: Milan (ITA) – 3rd place (single scull)
 2005: Gifu (JPN) – 1st place (double scull), 2nd place (quadruple scull)
 2006: Eton (GBR) – 2nd place (double scull)
 2007: Munich (GER) – 1st place (double scull)

See also
 List of athletes with the most appearances at Olympic Games

External links
 IztokCop.com – Official website (Slovene and English)
 

1972 births
Living people
Slovenian male rowers
Olympic rowers of Slovenia
Rowers at the 1992 Summer Olympics
Rowers at the 1996 Summer Olympics
Rowers at the 2000 Summer Olympics
Rowers at the 2004 Summer Olympics
Rowers at the 2008 Summer Olympics
Rowers at the 2012 Summer Olympics
Olympic gold medalists for Slovenia
Olympic silver medalists for Slovenia
Olympic bronze medalists for Slovenia
Sportspeople from Kranj
Olympic medalists in rowing
Medalists at the 2012 Summer Olympics
Medalists at the 2004 Summer Olympics
World Rowing Championships medalists for Slovenia
Medalists at the 2000 Summer Olympics
Medalists at the 1992 Summer Olympics
Thomas Keller Medal recipients
World Rowing Championships medalists for Yugoslavia